Armando Bó II (born 9 December 1978) is an Argentine screenwriter and film director. He won the Academy Award for Best Original Screenplay for the 2014 film Birdman at the 87th Academy Awards in 2015, together with director Alejandro G. Iñárritu, Alexander Dinelaris Jr., and Bo's cousin Nicolás Giacobone. He also directed the Qualcomm-distributed short film Lifeline in 2016, which was also a Best of Branded Entertainment winner at the 2017 One Show Awards.

His father is the actor Víctor Bó and his mother is Chia Sly. His paternal grandfather was film director Armando Bó.

Filmography 
 Animal (2018) - screenwriter, director; with Guillermo Francella
 Birdman (2014) - screenwriter; with Michael Keaton, Zach Galifianakis, Edward Norton, Emma Stone, and Naomi Watts
 The Last Elvis (2012) - screenwriter, director, producer, editor
 Biutiful (2010) - screenwriter; with Javier Bardem

References

External links 
 

Living people
Best Original Screenplay Academy Award winners
Argentine screenwriters
Male screenwriters
Argentine male writers
Argentine film directors
1978 births
Best Screenplay AACTA International Award winners